Georgina Herrmann,  (born 20 October 1937) is a British retired archaeologist and academic, specialising in Near Eastern archaeology. Having worked as a civil servant, she later studied archaeology and spent the rest of her career as an active field archaeologist and lecturer. She was Reader in the Archaeology of Western Asia at University College London from 1994 to 2002.

Early life and education
Herrmann was born on 20 October 1937 to John and Gladys Thompson. He first career was as a secretary in the Foreign Office from 1956 to 1961. She then returned to education, and studied for a postgraduate diploma at the Institute of Archaeology, University of London, which she completed in 1963. She then undertook research at St Hugh's College, Oxford, graduating with a Doctor of Philosophy (DPhil) degree in 1966. Her doctoral thesis was titled "The source, distribution, history and use of Lapis Lazuli in western Asia from the earliest times to the end of the Seleucid era": this was the first extensive study of the Lapis Lazuli trade originating in Afghanistan. Her doctoral supervisor was Max Mallowan.

Academic career
Herrmann began her academic career as J. R. MacIver Junior Research Fellow at the University of Oxford from 1966 to 1968. She was Calouste Gulbenkian Fellow at the University of Cambridge from 1974 to 1976. She was Regents’ Professor at University of California at Berkeley in 1986. From 1985 to 1991, she held a Leverhulme Research Fellowship and was a part-time lecturer at the Institute of Archaeology, University of London. With the Institute merging into University College London (UCL) in 1986, she was a lecturer in Mesopotamian archaeology at UCL from 1991 to 1993 and Reader in the Archaeology of Western Asia from 1993 until she retired in 2002.

Herrmann's early research interests included Sasanian rock reliefs in Iran, the third millennium BCE lapis lazuli trade from Afghanistan, and the Nimrud ivories. In 1992, she became director of the excavations at Merv, a Silk Road oasis site in Turkmenistan. She played a key role in the successful application for Merv to become the first UNESCO World Heritage Site in Central Asia, which was granted in 1999.

In retirement, she was a visiting honorary research professor between 2002 and 2020, and she has been emeritus reader since 2020. She was a member of council of the British Academy between 2012 and 2015.

Personal life
In 1965, Georgina Thompson married Luke John Herrmann, a German-born British art historian. Together they had two sons. Her husband predeceased her, dying in 2016.

Honours
On 4 January 1968, Herrmann was elected a Fellow of the Society of Antiquaries of London (FSA). In 1996, she was awarded the Rolex Award for Enterprise in Cultural Heritage for her work leading the excavation at Merv. In 1997, she was elected an honorary foreign member of the American Institute of Archaeology. In 1999, she was elected a Fellow of the British Academy (FBA), the United Kingdom's national academy for the humanities and social sciences. In 2001, she was appointed an Officer of the Order of the British Empire (OBE).

Selected works

References

1937 births
Living people
British archaeologists
British women archaeologists
20th-century archaeologists
21st-century archaeologists
Archaeologists of the Near East
Fellows of the British Academy
Fellows of the Society of Antiquaries of London
Officers of the Order of the British Empire
Academics of University College London
20th-century British civil servants
21st-century British women writers
20th-century British women writers
British women historians
Alumni of the UCL Institute of Archaeology
Alumni of St Hugh's College, Oxford
Academics of the University of Oxford
Academics of the University of Cambridge
Academics of the UCL Institute of Archaeology